In theoretical computer science, a pseudorandom generator for low-degree polynomials is an efficient procedure that maps a short truly random seed to a longer pseudorandom string in such a way that low-degree polynomials cannot distinguish the output distribution of the generator from the truly random distribution. That is, evaluating any low-degree polynomial at a point determined by the pseudorandom string is statistically close to evaluating the same polynomial at a point that is chosen uniformly at random.

Pseudorandom generators for low-degree polynomials are a particular instance of pseudorandom generators for statistical tests, where the statistical tests considered are evaluations of low-degree polynomials.

Definition

Construction

The case  corresponds to pseudorandom generators for linear functions and is solved by small-bias generators.

 conjectured that the sum of small-bias generators fools low-degree polynomials and were able to prove this under the Gowers inverse conjecture.
 proved unconditionally that the sum of  small-bias spaces fools polynomials of degree .
 proves that, in fact, taking the sum of only  small-bias generators is sufficient to fool polynomials of degree .

References
 
 
  
 

Pseudorandomness